The 1969 World Running Target Championships were separate ISSF World Shooting Championships for the 100 metre running deer event held in Sandviken, Sweden. The competition was also valid as a 1969 European Running Target Championships, in which the rankings of the races played with all world athletes were drawn up taking into account only European athletes.

50 m running target
Individual

Team

Medal count

See also
1969 World Shotgun Championships

References

External links

World Running Target Championships
Shooting
S
1969 in Swedish sport
Sport in Gävleborg County
Shooting competitions in Sweden